Grand Tracadie may refer to:

Grand Tracadie, Prince Edward Island, a community in Prince Edward Island, Canada
Regional Municipality of Grand Tracadie–Sheila, a regional municipality in New Brunswick, Canada